Kewanee station is an Amtrak intercity train station in Kewanee, Illinois. A new station opened on April 13, 2012, replacing a smaller brick structure built in 1986. In addition to the waiting room, the depot houses a regional office of the Henry County Tourism Bureau. The station is serviced by the Illinois Zephyr and Carl Sandburg. The California Zephyr and Southwest Chief also use these tracks but do not stop in Kewanee. The original historic Chicago, Burlington and Quincy Railroad (CB&Q) station was demolished in 1985.

New station
Designed by the Peoria-based Farnsworth Group, the new $485,000 station has a sloping roof and great wall of glass. The primary decoration is a large neon sign, placed high on the waiting room wall, that spells out "KEWANEE." In 2009, town officials set aside $300,000 in capital funds for the project; additional funds came from the city's economic development fund. The city later applied for two state grants to help cover approximately half of the depot's cost. A total of $163,000 was gained through "Illinois Jobs Now!", a six-year, $31-billion statewide capital program supported by 20 year state bonds and federal and local matching funds. An additional $75,000 came through a state grant obtained by State Senator Darin LaHood and State Representative Don Moffitt. The new station opened in 2012.

References

External links

Kewanee Amtrak Station (USA RailGuide — TrainWeb)

Amtrak stations in Illinois
Kewanee, Illinois
Former Chicago, Burlington and Quincy Railroad stations
Buildings and structures in Henry County, Illinois